Elean Roslyn Thomas (18 September 1947 – 27 May 2004) was a Jamaican poet, novelist, journalist and activist. She was active in the struggle for women's rights in the Caribbean and the movement for Jamaican national independence, as well as working in Latin America, Eastern and Western Europe and Africa. She was married (1988–97) to human rights barrister Anthony Gifford.

Biography
Elean Thomas was born in St. Catherine, Jamaica, to a health-worker mother and a father (Rt. Rev. David Thomas) who was a Pentecostal bishop.

She attended the University of the West Indies (UWI) in the late 1960s, reading politics and history, and did postgraduate work in communications at Goldsmiths College, London University.

In the 1970s, she was employed as a reporter by the Jamaica Gleaner, and was head of the editorial department of the Jamaica Information Service, as well as working with other small publications. She also served on the executive of the Press Association of Jamaica. In 1976, she was a founding member in Jamaica of the Committee of Women for Progress, championing such issues as maternity leave and equal pay. She also taught history and English in Jamaica, and co-founded the National Union of Democratic Teachers.

Alongside Trevor Munroe and others, she was a founder-member of the Workers Party of Jamaica (WPJ) and, as its international secretary, served on the editorial board of World Marxist Review, which was based in Prague, Czechoslovakia; as a consequence she travelled throughout Europe, while also building strong connections in South Africa.

In Jamaica she campaigned against the 1983 US invasion of Grenada, and in 1984 invited English barrister Anthony Gifford to speak to a human rights committee she set up. They married in 1988, the marriage being dissolved in 1998.

Although categorised as a poet, she herself said: "I call my pieces Word-Rhythms. I honestly believe it is pretentious to call them poems. They are merely word-sketches, word-photographs, word-drawings, word-paintings, word-beats." Her first collection, Word Rhythms From The Life Of A Woman (1986), was published in 1986 by Karia Press. In 1988 Karia also published her second collection, Before They Can Speak Of Flowers: Word Rhythms, which had a foreword by Ngũgĩ wa Thiong'o and an introduction by Benjamin Zephaniah.

Her novel, The Last Room, was published by Virago Press in 1991, winning the Ruth Hadden Memorial Award for best first novel published in Britain. Elean Thomas's work is anthologised in Daughters of Africa (1992), edited by Margaret Busby.

Elean Thomas died aged 56 at the Hope Institute in Kingston, Jamaica, on 27 May 2004, after suffering from cancer.

Bibliography
 Word Rhythms from the Life of a Woman, London: Karia Press, 1986. 
 Before They Can Speak Of Flowers: Word Rhythms, London: Karia Press, 1988. 
 The Last Room (novel), London: Virago Press, 1991.

References

Further reading
 Annie Paul, "Interview...with Elean Thomas", Caribbean Review of Books, No. 2, November 1991, pp. 17–18, 26.
 "ICA talks: Elean Thomas and Corinne Thomas, in conversation" (17 July 1992), Sounds, British Library.

1947 births
20th-century Jamaican novelists
20th-century Jamaican poets
20th-century Jamaican women writers
20th-century journalists
2004 deaths
Alumni of Goldsmiths, University of London
Deaths from cancer in Jamaica
Jamaican activists
Jamaican educators
Jamaican journalists
Jamaican women journalists
Jamaican women novelists
Jamaican women poets
People from Saint Catherine Parish
University of the West Indies alumni
Gifford